The following outline is provided as an overview of and topical guide to computing:

Computing – activity of using and improving computer hardware and computer software.

Branches of computing
 Computer science (see also Outline of computer science)
 Information technology – refers to the application (esp in businesses and other organisations) of computer science, that is, its use by mankind (see also Outline of information technology)
 Information systems – refers to the study of the application of IT to business processes
 Computer engineering (see also Outline of computer engineering)
 Software engineering  (see also Outline of software engineering)

Computer science

Computer science – (outline)
 Computer science
 Theory of computation
 Scientific computing
 Metacomputing
 Autonomic computing

Computers 

See information processor for a high-level block diagram.
 Computer
 Computer hardware
 History of computing hardware
 Processor design
 Computer network
 Computer performance by orders of magnitude

Instruction-level taxonomies
After the commoditization of memory, attention turned to optimizing CPU performance at the instruction level. Various methods of speeding up the fetch-execute cycle include:
 designing instruction set architectures with simpler, faster instructions: RISC as opposed to CISC
 Superscalar instruction execution
 VLIW architectures, which make parallelism explicit

Software

 Software engineering
 Computer programming
 Computational
 Software patent
 Firmware
 System software
 Device drivers
 Operating systems
 Utilities
 Application Software
 Databases
 Geographic information system
 Spreadsheet
 Word processor
 Programming languages
 interpreters
 Compilers
 Assemblers
 Speech recognition
 Speech synthesis

History of computing
 History of computing
History of computing hardware from the tally stick to the quantum computer
History of computer science
History of computer animation
History of computer graphics
History of computer networking
History of computer vision
Punched card
Unit record equipment
IBM 700/7000 series
IBM 1400 series
IBM System/360
History of IBM magnetic disk drives

Business computing
 Accounting software
 Computer-aided design
 Computer-aided manufacturing
 Computer-aided dispatch
 Customer relationship management
 Data warehouse
 Decision support system
 Electronic data processing
 Enterprise resource planning
 Geographic information system
 Hospital information system
 Human resource management system
 Management information system
 Material requirements planning
 Product Lifecycle Management
 Strategic enterprise management
 Supply chain management
 Utility Computing

Human factors
 Accessible computing
 Computer-induced medical problems
 Computer user satisfaction
 Human-computer interaction (outline)
 Human-centered computing

Computer network

Wired and wireless computer network

 Types
 Wide area network
 Metropolitan area network
 City Area Network
 Village Area Network
 Local area network
 Wireless local area network
 Mesh networking
 Collaborative workspace
 Internet
 Network management

Computing technology based wireless networking (CbWN)
The main goal of CbWN is to optimize the system performance of the flexible wireless network.
 Source coding
 Codebook design for side information based transmission techniques such as Precoding
 Wyner-Ziv coding for cooperative wireless communications
 Security
 Dirty paper coding for cooperative multiple antenna or user precoding
 Intelligence
 Game theory for wireless networking
 Cognitive communications
 Flexible sectorization, Beamforming and SDMA
 Software
 Software defined radio (SDR)
 Programmable air-interface
 Downloadable algorithm: e.g., downloadable codebook for Precoding

Computer security
 Cryptology – cryptography – information theory
 Cracking – demon dialing – Hacking – war dialing – war driving
 Social engineering – Dumpster diving
 Physical security – Black bag job
 Computer security
 Computer surveillance
 Defensive programming
 Malware
 Security engineering

Data

Numeric data
 Integral data types – bit, byte, etc.
 Real data types:
 Floating point (Single precision, Double precision, etc.)
 Fixed point
 Rational number
 Decimal
 Binary-coded decimal (BCD)
 Excess-3 BCD (XS-3)
 Biquinary-coded decimal
 representation: Binary – Octal – Decimal – Hexadecimal (hex)
Computer mathematics – Computer numbering formats

Character data
 storage: Character – String – text
 representation: ASCII – Unicode – Multibyte – EBCDIC (Widecharacter, Multicharacter) – FIELDATA – Baudot

Other data topics
Data compression
Digital signal processing
Image processing
Data management
Routing
Data Protection Act

Classes of computers

There are several terms which describe classes, or categories, of computers:
 Analog computer
 Calculator
 Desktop computer
 Desktop replacement computer
 Digital computer
 Embedded computer
 Home computer
 Laptop
 Mainframe
 Minicomputer
 Microcomputer
 Personal computer
 Portable computer
 Personal digital assistant (aka PDA, or Handheld computer)
 Programmable logic controller or PLC
 Server
 Smartphone
 Supercomputer
 Tablet computer
 Video game console
 Workstation

Organizations

Companies – current
 Apple
 Asus
 Avaya
 Dell
 Fujitsu
 Gateway Computers
 Groupe Bull
 HCL
 Hewlett-Packard
 Hitachi, Ltd.
 Intel Corporation
 IBM
 Lenovo
 Microsoft
 NEC Corporation
 Novell
 Panasonic
 Red Hat
 Silicon Graphics
 Sun Microsystems
 Unisys

Companies – historic
 Acorn, bought by Olivetti
 Amdahl Corporation, bought by Fujitsu
 Bendix Corporation
 Burroughs Corporation, merged with Sperry to become Unisys
 Compaq, bought by Hewlett-Packard
 Control Data
 Cray
 Data General
 Digital Equipment Corporation, bought by Compaq, later bought by Hewlett-Packard
 Digital Research – produced system software for early Intel microprocessor-based computers
 Elliott Brothers
 English Electric Company
 Ferranti
 General Electric, computer division bought by Honeywell, then Bull
 Honeywell, computer division bought by Bull
 ICL
 Leo
 Lisp Machines, Inc.
 Marconi
 Micro Instrumentation and Telemetry Systems produced the first widely sold microcomputer system (kit and assembled)
 Nixdorf Computer, bought by Siemens
 Norsk Data
 Olivetti
 Osborne
 Packard Bell
 PERQ
 Prime Computer
 Raytheon
 Royal McBee
 RCA
 Scientific Data Systems, sold to Xerox
 Siemens
 Sinclair Research, created the ZX Spectrum, ZX80, and ZX81
 Southweat Technical products Corporation produced microcomputers systems (kit and assembled), peripherals, and software based on Motorola 6800 and 6809 microcomputer chips
 Sperry, which bought UNIVAC, and later merged with Burroughs to become Unisys
 Symbolics
 UNIVAC
 Varian Data Machines, a division of Varian Associates which was bought by Sperry
 Wang

Professional organizations

 Association for Computing Machinery (ACM)
 Association for Survey Computing (ASC)
 British Computer Society (BCS)
 Canadian Information Processing Society (CIPS)
 Computer Measurement Group (CMG)
 Institute of Electrical and Electronics Engineers (IEEE), in particular the IEEE Computer Society
 Institution of Electrical Engineers
 International Electrotechnical Commission (IEC)

Standards bodies

 International Electrotechnical Commission (IEC)
 International Organization for Standardization (ISO)
 Institute of Electrical and Electronics Engineers (IEEE)
 Internet Engineering Task Force (IETF)
 World Wide Web Consortium (W3C)

Open standards bodies 
See also Open standard

 Apdex Alliance – Application Performance Index
 Application Response Measurement (ARM)

Computing publications 

 Digital Bibliography & Library Project – , lists over 910,000 bibliographic entries on computer science and several thousand links to the home pages of computer scientists.

Persons influential in computing 
Major figures associated with making personal computers popular.
Microsoft
Bill Gates
Paul Allen
Apple Inc.
Steve Jobs
Steve Wozniak

External links 

FOLDOC: the Free On-Line Dictionary Of Computing

Computing
Computing